Mongyai Township is a township of Lashio District in the Shan State of eastern Burma. The principal town is Mongyai. Mount Loi Leng (1,823 m) of Mongyai is the highest point in Shan State.

History
Historically Mong Yai was the capital of South Hsenwi state.
Sao Hso Holm, ex-saopha of Mongyai was one of the founders of Shan Nationalities League for Democracy in October 1988. Khun Sa was born in Loi Maw of Mongyai Township at 17 February 1934.

There were several skirmishes between Myanmar Army and Shan State Army in Mongyai during 2011.

Towns and villages

 Hai-ko
 Hai-pu
 Hang-hsio
 Hapa-palang
 Hatlö
 Hat-yao
 Hau-ti
 Hio-hka
 Hkai-aw
 Hkai-lu
 Hkaimawn
 Hkam-yom
 Hkawnhkok
 Hko-hak
 Hko-lawn
 Hko-mong
 Hko-nim
 Hkö-tum
 Ho-hko (22°27'0"N 97°55'0"E)
 Ho-hko (22°16'0"N 97°58'0"E)
 Ho-hko-nam-hpak-lün
 Ho-hkong
 Ho-hwè
 Hok-la
 Ho-lan
 Ho-leng
 Ho-na
 Honghang
 Hongmon
 Ho-pong
 Ho-tawng
 Ho-tu
 Hpa-hin
 Hpa-hseng
 Hpakkom
 Hpaknam
 Hpanghpai
 Hpa-suk
 Hpa-tan
 Hsaihkao
 Hsai-kau
 Hsai-leng
 Hsentaw
 Hswe-hpu
 Hwe-hok
 Hwe-lawt
 Hwè-lü
 Ka-lo
 Kawng-hka
 Kawnghkam (22°32'0"N 97°58'0"E)
 Kawnghkam (22°30'0"N 97°56'0"E)
 Kawng-hōng (22°41'0"N 97°53'0"E)
 Kawng-hong (22°38'0"N 97°52'0"E)
 Kawnghsan
 Kawng-hsang
 Kawng-ke
 Kawng-sam (22°44'0"N 97°55'0"E)
 Kawng-sam (22°34'0"N 97°53'0"E)
 Kawng-sam (22°34'0"N 97°50'0"E)
 Kawng-up
 Kawngwit
 Kio-it
 Kio-wün
 Kōng-hsa
 Konghsa
 Kōng-möng
 Kongmong
 Kong-nio (22°42'0"N 97°54'0"E)
 Kōng-nio (22°35'0"N 97°56'0"E)
 Kongnio
 Kong-pau
 Kong-söng
 Kōng-wat
 Kunghkam
 Kunghsa
 Kung-kaw
 Kungsong
 Kungwit
 Kun-hio
 Kunkeng
 Kun-loi
 Laksang
 Lenti
 Lin-ten
 Loi-hkan
 Loihseng
 Loi-lungtung
 Loi-ngam
 Loi-ngun (22°36'0"N 97°52'0"E)
 Loi-ngün (22°23'0"N 97°53'0"E)
 Loi-sawng
 Loi-ywoi
 Löng-kawng
 Löngkwai
 Longtawng
 Luk-hkai
 Lukhkai
 Lukkaw
 Luk-maw-hkang
 Māklāng
 Māk-mon
 Māk-na
 Māngpung
 Mān Hawng
 Mān Hkum
 Mān Hpai (22°24'0"N 98°0'0"E)
 Mān Hpai (22°14'0"N 98°7'0"E)
 Mān Hpakkom
 Mān Hpit
 Mān Ka
 Mān-kau-lōng (22°30'0"N 97°51'0"E)
 Mān-kau-lōng (22°27'0"N 97°50'0"E)
 Mān Kaw-leng
 Mān Kio
 Mān Kun
 Mān Kyawng (22°26'0"N 98°5'0"E)
 Mān Kyawng (22°20'0"N 97°59'0"E)
 Mān Kyawng (22°13'0"N 98°4'0"E)
 Mān Kyawng (22°6'0"N 98°7'0"E)
 Mān Lang-ta
 Mān Lawng
 Mān Loi (22°31'0"N 98°6'0"E)
 Mān Loi (22°13'0"N 98°0'0"E)
 Mān Loi-ha
 Mān Loi-haw
 Mān Mau (22°36'0"N 97°50'0"E)
 Mān Maü (22°25'0"N 97°50'0"E)
 Mān Maü (22°17'0"N 98°14'0"E)
 Man Na-lai
 Man Nam-hu-hsim
 Mān Nawng (22°29'0"N 97°53'0"E)
 Mān Nawng (22°5'0"N 98°8'0"E)
 Mān Ngu-löm
 Mān Pāng (22°32'0"N 97°59'0"E)
 Mān Pang (22°22'0"N 98°11'0"E)
 Mān Pong
 Mānpung
 Mān Punghtun
 Mān Sang
 Mān Sau-hpak
 Mān Tap
 Mān Tawng-kaw
 Man Weng
 Mān Yawn
 Möng Ha
 Möng Heng
 Möng Kang
 Möng Kawng
 Möng Ngong
 Möng Yai
 Na-hi
 Nā-hio
 Nahkam
 Na-hko
 Nā-hok
 Na-hpan
 Na-hsai
 Nā-hsan
 Nā-hsang
 Na-long
 Na-ma-hio
 Na-maklang
 Nam-aw
 Nam-hawn
 Nam-hkum-hpa
 Namhsawm
 Namhsum
 Nam-hu (22°40'0"N 97°53'0"E)
 Nam-hu (22°37'0"N 97°51'0"E)
 Nam-hu (22°25'0"N 97°52'0"E)
 Namhu
 Namhu-hpa-lang
 Nam-hu-tai-hsan
 Namhu-un
 Nam-küt
 Namlin
 Namma
 Namma-kaw
 Namman
 Nammawhsom (22°36'0"N 97°48'0"E)
 Nammawhsom (22°20'0"N 97°52'0"E)
 Nā-mong
 Nampa-lum
 Nampawn
 Nampen
 Nampōk
 Nampot
 Namsam
 Nam-tung
 Nam-ün
 Na-mun
 Nam Ut
 Nam-yom
 Na-namhpa
 Na-ngu
 Nā-nio (22°33'0"N 97°50'0"E)
 Na-nio (22°28'0"N 97°55'0"E)
 Na-pan
 Na-sawk
 Na-si-ri
 Na-ti
 Na-tung
 Na-wa
 Nā-wi
 Nawnghawn
 Nawng-hket
 Nawnghkio
 Nawnghpakkut
 Nawngkaw
 Nawnglang
 Nawngleng
 Nawnglom
 Nawngmo
 Nawngmop
 Nawng-pa-keng
 Nawngpeng
 Nawngsāng
 Nawngtao
 Nawngteng
 Nawngwawn
 Nawng-ya
 Nā-ya
 Pa-hka
 Pa-hki
 Pānghio
 Pānghku
 Pānghpakhi
 Pang-law
 Pāng-leng
 Pāngnim
 Pang-oi
 Pang-wet
 Pa-tap
 Peng-yu
 Ping-hkan
 Pingkwe
 Pungsang
 Ta-hat
 Tak-let
 Ta-pe
 Tawngseng
 Wo-long

References

Townships of Shan State